He Ran All the Way is a 1951 American  crime drama and film noir directed by John Berry and starring John Garfield and Shelley Winters.  Distributed by United Artists, it was produced independently by Roberts Pictures, a company named for Garfield's manager and business partner, Bob Roberts, and bankrolled by Garfield.

The film was Garfield's last.  He was "greylisted" following accusations of his involvement with the Communist Party USA.  Testifying before the House Committee on Un-American Activities (aka HUAC), he repudiated communism, denied party membership, and claimed that he did not know any members of the Communist Party during his entire time in Hollywood, "because I was not a party member or associated in any shape, way, or form." He testified on April 23, 1951, just two months before He Ran All the Way was scheduled to open, on June 19.  Garfield died less than a year later, on May 21, 1952, at age 39.

Dalton Trumbo had signed to write the screen adaptation of Sam Ross's novel just weeks from starting the jail term resulting from his own testimony to HUAC, in 1947.  According to Trumbo's son, Christopher, Guy Endore did some revisions to Trumbo's script, as did director Berry.  In a 1997 letter to the Writers Guild of America West, which was determining the restoration of credits to blacklisted members, Trumbo's widow Cleo stated that their friend and fellow writer Hugo Butler had been asked by Trumbo to ensure that the script not be altered while he was incarcerated, and Butler restored much of the original material, adding some of his own.  The film opened in June 1951, the screenplay credited to Endore and Butler, and John Berry credited as the director. Just prior to the premiere, Berry and Butler were subpoenaed by HUAC, and producer Bob Roberts removed their names from advertising, first in the trade press, and then in the general press as the film circulated.

Trumbo was paid $5,000 and five percent of the producers' profits on condition that the picture would cost no more than $400,000, with the possibility that it might cost $100,000 less than that, but he complained to Roberts that the costs had grown to about $650,000, adding, "and that came right out of my pocket."  Variety reviewer "Bron." observed, "Production budget seems limited to insure safe returns," and predicted, "pic should do biz."  At the end of the year, the trade paper estimated that He Ran All the Way would gross $1 million in the domestic market (i.e., USA and Canada), its threshold for reporting the "top grossers" of the year.  Less than a month after Garfield's death in May 1952, United Artists announced it would rerelease the title, among three others, in summer of that year.

Plot
Petty thief Nick Robey botches a robbery, leaving his partner Al severely wounded as Nick escapes with over $10,000. He meets bakery worker Peg Dobbs, and when Peg takes Nick to her family's apartment, he takes the family hostage until he can escape.

As a manhunt for Nick begins outside, he becomes increasingly paranoid. Peg's initial attraction to Nick is replaced by fear. Her mother and father plead with Nick to leave, to no avail. Nick permits Mr. Dobbs to leave for work, warning him of the consequences should the police be contacted.

Still confident that Peg will run away with him, Nick gives her $1,500 to buy a new car. He refuses to believe her when Peg returns and insists that the car will be delivered to the front door because the headlights needed repair. Nick violently pushes her down the stairs toward the exit, terrifying her. Mr. Dobbs, who had been waiting outside, shoots at Nick. When Nick's gun drops beyond his reach and he orders Peg to hand it to him, she shoots him instead. A mortally wounded Nick crawls outside to the kerb just as his new car arrives.

Cast
 John Garfield as Nick Robey
 Shelley Winters as Peg Dobbs
 Wallace Ford as Mr. Dobbs
 Selena Royle as Mrs. Dobbs
 Gladys George as Mrs. Robey
 Norman Lloyd as Al Molin
 Bobby Hyatt as Tommy Dobbs
 Keith Hetherington as Captain of Detectives

Reception
When the film was released, New York Times film critic Bosley Crowther praised Garfield's work, writing:John Garfield's stark performance of the fugitive who desperately contrives to save himself briefly from capture is full of startling glints from start to end. He makes a most odd and troubled creature, unused to the normal flow of life, unable to perceive the moral standards of decent people or the tentative advance of a good girl's love. And in Mr. Garfield's performance, vis-a-vis the rest of the cast, is conveyed a small measure of the irony and the pity that was in the book.
Variety called the film "a taut gangster pic," adding, "Good production values keep a routine yarn fresh and appealing.  Film is scripted, played and directed all the way with little waste motion, so that the suspense is steady and interest constantly sustained."  Reviewer "Bron." commended both Garfield's and Winters's performances, as well as an "unusually good" supporting cast, and, among other personnel, singled out composer Franz Waxman ("Pull of pic is further hyped by a strong music score...") and director of photography James Wong Howe, for "some markedly effective camera shots...."

More recently, film critic Dennis Schwartz has also written positively of Garfield's performance:He Ran All the Way was the last film made by the brilliant John Garfield ... Garfield gives a terrific chilling performance as someone who is less like a cold-blooded killer than someone who has been rejected all his life by family and the outside world, and like a wounded animal goes on the run as a desperate man in search of someone to trust in this cold world.

See also
 List of films featuring home invasions

References

External links
 
 
 
 
 He Ran All the Way informational site and DVD review at DVD Beaver (includes images)
 

1951 films
1951 crime drama films
American crime drama films
Film noir
Films scored by Franz Waxman
Films based on American novels
Films directed by John Berry
Films set in Los Angeles
Films with screenplays by Dalton Trumbo
United Artists films
American black-and-white films
1950s English-language films
1950s American films